Elder José Figueroa Sarmiento (born October 14, 1980 in Riohacha) is a Colombian and naturalized Salvadoran football player.

Figueroa became a naturalized citizen of El Salvador in 2011, and received his first call-up to the El Salvador national football team a year later.

References

External links
 El Gráfico Profile 

1980 births
Living people
People from La Guajira Department
Salvadoran footballers
El Salvador international footballers
Colombian footballers
Colombian emigrants to El Salvador
Naturalized citizens of El Salvador
Salvadoran people of Colombian descent
Association football defenders
Real Cartagena footballers
Tigres F.C. footballers
C.D. Vista Hermosa footballers
Atlético Balboa footballers
Alianza F.C. footballers
Once Municipal footballers
C.D. FAS footballers
Colombian expatriate footballers
Expatriate footballers in El Salvador